Anita Fatis (born 10 September 1963) is a French Paralympic swimmer who competes in backstroke and freestyle swimming events in international level events. She is also a political candidate to become a mayor of Thionville.

References

External links 
 
 

1963 births
Living people
Sportspeople from Dunkirk
People from Thionville
Paralympic swimmers of France
Swimmers at the 2012 Summer Paralympics
Swimmers at the 2016 Summer Paralympics
People with multiple sclerosis
Medalists at the World Para Swimming Championships
Medalists at the World Para Swimming European Championships
S5-classified Paralympic swimmers